Brother Future is a historical period/ coming of age movie made in 1991. It starred Phill Lewis, Moses Gunn, Frank Converse, Carl Lumbly and Vonetta McGee. A street kid (Phill Lewis) from Detroit, Michigan, is hit by a car; when he awakes, he finds himself a slave in South Carolina in 1822. The boy then has to help his fellow slaves so he can return to his own time. Roy Campanella II directed this made-for-TV movie.  Music by Stephen James Taylor.

Plot
The movie begins with TJ (Phill Lewis), a high school student from Detroit, selling stolen items to other members of his neighborhood. Upon returning to class, TJ finds he has to write a paper on a famous black person for his Black History class. TJ is later seen selling more stolen material while talking to his friend, but a police officer starts to chase him. While running, TJ gets hit by a car and is knocked unconscious.

When TJ awakens, he finds himself in 1822 in South Carolina, right next to an exceptionally large tree. Thinking that he is a runaway slave, TJ is brought to a slave auction and is sold to a man named Mr. Cooper. TJ then has to work on Mr. Cooper's plantation, and gets himself into all sorts of mischief.

While getting Zeke's (the black slave driver) food from Cooper's house, TJ runs into a house slave, Martilla, who also happens to be a palm reader. She tells TJ that to return to his own time, he must help another slave and then find the big tree which he was next to when he woke up after being hit by the car. After trying to help his fellow slaves with their chores, TJ becomes frustrated and attempts to run away. Unfortunately, he is stopped by Zeke, who then whips him.

Back at the plantation, TJ helps one of his fellow slaves, Josiah, learn to read. He shows Josiah how to write his name, and they read out of a book that Josiah stole from Cooper. To try to get Zeke in trouble with Cooper, he places the book in Zeke's house. Cooper finds the book, but also finds a piece of paper in the book in which Josiah had practiced writing his name. Josiah is then whipped to such an extent that he cannot move.

Due to Josiah's inability to move, he tells TJ to find Denmark Vesey and tell him about what happened. TJ does as he is told, and when he returns TJ tells Josiah what Vesey has told him. Josiah, TJ and Zeke have been asked to work at a party at Cooper's house serving food, but Josiah asks TJ to cover for him at seven o'clock as he is allied with Vesey and is part of Vesey's plan to rebel. Zeke overhears this and rushes to tell Cooper.

At the party, Zeke tells Cooper about what he has heard. TJ hears this and reports it to Josiah. The two then decide to escape. They also bring along Josiah's girlfriend Caroline. Cooper and Zeke chase after the trio. TJ decides to stall them and, while Josiah and Caroline escape, Cooper shoots TJ. He falls from the shot, right under the big tree.
When awakened, TJ finds himself back in his own time, where he decides to do better at school. He learns that to help yourself you sometimes have to help others. He also returns with a new pride in his heritage. TJ learns to become better and wants to get better grades to stay out of trouble.

Awards
Brother Future won a DGA Award for "Outstanding Directorial Achievement in Dramatic Shows – Daytime" in 1992.

Brother Future was nominated for a Daytime Emmy in 1990–91 for Outstanding Achievement in Musical Direction.

See also
List of films featuring slavery

External links

1991 films
American science fiction films
1990s science fiction films
Films about time travel
African-American films
Films scored by Stephen James Taylor
Films set in Detroit
Films set in South Carolina
Films set in the 1820s
American television films
1990s English-language films
1990s American films